Janusz Niedźwiedź (born 23 January 1982) is a Polish football manager and former player who manages Widzew Łódź.

He has played in and managed in I liga. In the summer of 2020, he managed the A Lyga club FK Riteriai, but left after one week citing "personal and administrative" reasons.

References

1982 births
Living people
Polish footballers
Association football midfielders
I liga players
II liga players
III liga players
Olimpia Elbląg players
Warta Poznań players
Tur Turek players
Polonia Słubice players
Mieszko Gniezno players
Polish football managers
Radomiak Radom managers
Stal Rzeszów managers
FK Riteriai managers
Widzew Łódź managers
I liga managers
II liga managers

Polish expatriate football managers
Polish expatriate sportspeople in Lithuania
Expatriate football managers in Lithuania